Sławomir Zawada  is a Polish  weightlifter. He won a bronze medal in the 90 kg class at the 1988 Summer Olympics in Seoul.

References 

1965 births
Living people
Olympic weightlifters of Poland
Weightlifters at the 1988 Summer Olympics
Olympic bronze medalists for Poland
Olympic medalists in weightlifting
Medalists at the 1988 Summer Olympics
People from Więcbork
Polish male weightlifters
20th-century Polish people
21st-century Polish people